Terrence Frederick "Terry" (T. F.) Rigelhof (born April 24, 1944) is a Canadian writer and academic. He is best known for A Blue Boy in a Black Dress, his memoir of his time studying at a Roman Catholic seminary school prior to abandoning the priesthood; the book was a shortlisted finalist for the Governor General's Award for English-language non-fiction at the 1996 Governor General's Awards, and won the Mavis Gallant Prize for Non-Fiction at the Quebec Writers' Federation Awards.

Originally from Regina, Saskatchewan, Rigelhof joined the seminary in the 1960s. He left those studies after a crisis of faith which left him suicidal, but retained an academic interest in the history and sociology of religion, becoming a longtime instructor at Montreal's Dawson College. He published the novel The Education of J.J. Pass (1983) and the short story collection Je t'aime, Cowboy (1993) prior to writing A Blue Boy in a Black Dress; he published one further novel, Badass on a Softail, in 1997 before concentrating on non-fiction writing thereafter. In addition to his books, he was a regular literary critic for The Globe and Mail and other publications.

His later non-fiction works included the Canadian literature studies This Is Our Writing (2000) and Hooked on Canadian Books: The Good, the Better, and the Best Canadian Novels Since 1984 (2010); the George Grant biography George Grant: Redefining Canada (2001); and a second memoir, Nothing Sacred: A Journey Beyond Belief (2004).

References

External links

1944 births
20th-century Canadian novelists
20th-century Canadian short story writers
21st-century Canadian non-fiction writers
Canadian male novelists
Canadian male short story writers
Canadian biographers
Canadian literary critics
Canadian memoirists
Writers from Regina, Saskatchewan
Writers from Montreal
Academic staff of Dawson College
Living people
Canadian historians of religion
20th-century Canadian male writers
21st-century Canadian male writers
Canadian male non-fiction writers